The 1907–08 season was Manchester United's 16th season in the Football League.

First Division

FA Cup

FA Charity Shield

References

Manchester United F.C. seasons
Manchester United
1908